John Lucy (born 1859, date of death unknown) was a United States Navy sailor and a recipient of the United States military's highest decoration, the Medal of Honor.

Born in 1859 in New York City, New York, Lucy joined the Navy from that state. By July 9, 1876, he was serving as a second class boy on the training ship . On that day, he "displayed heroic conduct" during a fire at the Castle Garden immigration facility in Manhattan. For this action, he was awarded the Medal of Honor weeks later, on July 27.

Lucy's official Medal of Honor citation reads:
Displayed heroic conduct while serving on board the U.S. Training Ship Minnesota on the occasion of the burning of Castle Garden at New York, 9 July 1876.

As Lucy was not more than 17 years old at the time of the incident, he is one of the youngest Medal of Honor recipients in history.

See also

List of Medal of Honor recipients in non-combat incidents

References

External links

1859 births
Year of death missing
Military personnel from New York City
United States Navy sailors
United States Navy Medal of Honor recipients
Non-combat recipients of the Medal of Honor